Gurnam Singh Charuni (also spelt Gurnam Singh Chaduni; born 1959) is a farm union leader and politician in the Indian states of Haryana and Punjab. He is the chief of the Bharatiya Kisan Union (BKU) in Haryana, and the founder of Sanyukt Sangharsh Party.

Early life 
Gurnam Singh was born in Charuni Jattan village in Shahbad, Kurukshetra district, Haryana in 1959. As per customs, he uses his village name. He has six siblings, and started helping his family with farming on failing his tenth standard.

Activism
In 2008 he successfully led a campaign for the farm loan waiver. In 2019 he protested with other farmers demanding the government purchase their sunflower crop.

He participated as one of the leaders in the 2020–2021 Indian farmers' protest.

Politics
In past, Chaduni had contested Haryana State Legislative assembly elections from the Ladwa (Vidhan Sabha constituency). He finished on seventh place and lost his security deposit. In October 2021, it was reported that he was planning to contest in Punjab elections.

Sanyukt Sangharsh Party

In 2020, after the Passing of three farm laws by Parliament of India there was a huge protest against it. Gurnam Singh Charuni was one of the leaders of the Samyukta Kisan Morcha. He was of the view that the farmers organisation must contest election to fulfill the demands of the farmers.

Gurnam Singh Chaduni launched his political party called Sanyukt Sangharsh Party on 18 December 2021. Party plans to contest in all 117 Punjab Legislative Assembly seats in the 2022 Punjab Legislative Assembly election. Later on he merged with the Sanyukt Samaj Morcha (a political party; consisting of 22 farmer organizations, that were in the Farmer’s Protest with Chaduni) and will contest 10 seats.

References 

Indian farmers
Farmers' rights activists
Living people
Indian politicians
1959 births
Leaders of 2020–2021 Indian farmers' protest
People from Kurukshetra district